Samuel Afriyie Owusu (born December 13, 2000) is a Ghanaian footballer who plays for New York City FC II in the MLS Next Pro.

Playing career

Youth
Owusu joined MLS club in 2016, entering their academy at the U15 level and working his way through several age categories. With them, he won the Generation Adidas Cup in 2016 and the U.S. Soccer Development Academy national championship in 2018 and 2019.

Professional
On January 19, 2022, Owusu signed his first professional contract with New York City FC. The club announced that he would be made available for the club's new development side, New York City FC II, playing in the first season of MLS Next Pro.

Career statistics
.

References 

2000 births
Ghanaian footballers
Association football defenders
Living people
New York City FC II players
MLS Next Pro players
Major League Soccer players
New York City FC players
21st-century Ghanaian people
Homegrown Players (MLS)